Jón Kristinn Gíslason (born 14 October 1962) is an Icelandic former professional basketball player and a coach. A four-time Icelandic Basketball Player of the Year, he won three national championships and two Icelandic Basketball Cups with Keflavík.

Icelandic national basketball team
Between 1982 and 1995, Jón played 158 games for the Icelandic national team. He coached the national team from 1995 to 1999 when his contract was not renewed. In 1998, he served as the head coach of the Icelandic women's national basketball team during the Promotion Cup.

Team of the 20th century
In 2001 Jón was voted to the Icelandic team of the 20th century in basketball as a player.

Family
Jón is the father of Úrvalsdeild players Dagur Kár Jónsson, Daði Lár Jónsson and Dúi Þór Jónsson.

References

External sites
Úrvalsdeild statistics at kki.is

1962 births
Living people
Jon Kr Gislason
Jon Kr Gislason
Jon Kr Gislason
Jon Kr Gislason
Jon Kr Gislason
Jon Kr Gislason
Jon Kr Gislason
Jon Kr Gislason
Point guards
SISU BK players
Jon Kr Gislason
Jon Kr Gislason
Jon Kr Gislason
Jon Kr Gislason
Jon Kr Gislason